Raffles Bay is a bay on the northern coast of the Cobourg Peninsula of the Top End of the Northern Territory of Australia.  It was named in 1818 by explorer Phillip Parker King after Sir Thomas Stamford Raffles, the founder of Singapore. It is about 10 km long north to south, 5 km wide at its mouth and 3 km wide at its inland end.  It lies about 210 km north-east of Darwin and opens on to the northern end of Bowen Strait, between the Cobourg Peninsula and Croker Island, and the Arafura Sea.  It was the site of an abortive attempt to establish the British military outpost and settlement of Fort Wellington, which lasted only two years, from 1827 to 1829.  The surrounds of the bay are largely uninhabited; it now lies within the Garig Gunak Barlu National Park.

References

Bays of the Northern Territory
Cobourg Peninsula